Metham is a hamlet in the East Riding of Yorkshire, England.

Metham may also refer to:

 Metham sodium, a pesticide
 Thomas Metham, an English Catholic knight